Nebbia in Val Padana is an Italian television series.

Cast
 Renato Pozzetto: Renato
 Cochi Ponzoni: Cochi
 Lia Tanzi: Elena
 Gisella Sofio: The Countess 
 Valeria Morosini: Monica

See also
List of Italian television series

External links
 

2000s Italian television series
2000 Italian television series debuts
2000 Italian television series endings
Italian television series
RAI original programming